This is an alphabetically sorted list of personalities from Bratislava in Slovakia. Due to the city's former multi-cultural character, in addition to Slovaks it includes people of German, Austrians, Hungarian and other nationalities.

A 
 Christian Attersee (born 1940), Austrian painter
 Lajos Aulich (1793–1849), Hungarian general and third Defence minister of Hungary.

B 
 Fritz Balogh (1920–1951), German football player
 Kázmér Batthyány (1807–1854), Hungarian politician, minister
 Lajos Batthyány (1807–1849), Hungarian magnate, first prime minister of Hungary.
 Shlomo Breznitz (born 1936), Israeli author, psychologist, and president of the University of Haifa

C 
 Ján Čapkovič (born 1948), Slovak football player
 Ján Čarnogurský (born 1944), Slovak politician

D 
 Herta Däubler-Gmelin (born 1943), German politician
 Árpád Degen (1866–1934), Hungarian biologist, member of the Hungarian Academy of Sciences
 Ernő Dohnányi (1877–1960), Hungarian pianist and composer
 Marek Dolezaj (born 1998), Slovak professional basketball player
 Jana Dukátová (born 1983), Slovak slalom canoeist
 Bucura Dumbravă (1868–1926), Romanian writer and esotericist

E 
 Stephan Ladislaus Endlicher (1804–1849), Austrian botanist.
 Yvette Estermann (born 1967), Swiss politician
 Elizabeth of Hungary (1207-1231), Catholic Saint.

F 
 János Fadrusz (1858–1903), Hungarian sculptor
 Martin Fehérváry (born 1999), ice hockey player
 Gisi Fleischmann (1894–1944), leader of the Bratislava Working Group
 Flora Frangepán (fl. 1743), Hungarian writer
 Ľubomír Ftáčnik (born 1957), Slovak chess master
 Ferdinand Udvardy (1895-1945), World War I flying ace of the Austro-Hungarian Empire

G 
 Jozef Golonka (born 1938), Slovak ice hockey player and coach
 Edita Gruberová (1946–2021), Slovak soprano
 Berthold Grünfeld (1932–2007), Norwegian psychiatrist and professor

H 
 Jaroslav Halák (born 1985), Slovak ice hockey player
 Erzsébet Házy (1929–1982), Hungarian opera singer
 Ludwig von Höhnel (1857–1942), Austrian explorer
 Olga Horak (born 1926), Australian survivor of the Holocaust; author
 Katarína Horáková (born 1934), university biology professor
 Dominik Hrbatý (born 1978), Slovak tennis player
 Johann Nepomuk Hummel (1778–1837), Austrian composer and pianist.
 Gustáv Husák (1913–1991), Slovak politician
 Michal Hvorecký (born 1976), Slovak author

J

 Miroslava Jánošíková (born 1969), Czech Olympic judoka
 Archduke Joseph Karl of Austria (1833–1905), Austrian archduke

K 
 Wolfgang von Kempelen (1734–1804), Hungarian inventor
 József Kiss de Elemér et Ittebe (1896-1918) World War I flying ace of the Austro-Hungarian Empire
 Ignác Kolisch (1837–1889), Hungarian banker and chess master
 Roman Kratochvíl (born 1974), Slovak football player
 Ján Kubiš (born 1952), Slovak politician
 Karol Kučera (born 1974), Slovak tennis player
 Kristína Kučová (born 1990), Slovak tennis player
 Jana Kulan (born 1987), Slovak-born Azerbaijani volleyball player

L 
 Rudolf Laban (1879–1958), Hungarian dance artist and theorist 
 Yehoshua Lakner (1924–2003), Israeli composer
 Philipp Lenard (1862–1947), Hungarian physicist, winner of the Nobel Prize for Physics in 1905, member of the Hungarian Academy of Sciences.
 Ľuba Lesná (born 1954), contemporary Slovak writer
 Imi Lichtenfeld (1910–1998), Israeli martial artist; founded the Krav Maga self-defense system
 Zuzana Licko (born 1960), American typeface designer
 Johanna Loisinger (1865–1951), Austrian opera singer
 Viliam Loviska (born 1964), sculptor
 Malte Ludin (born 1942), German filmmaker

M 
 Peter Machajdik (born 1961), composer
 Róbert Mak (born 1991), professional footballer 
 Ján Markoš (born 1985), author and chess player 
 Herbert Thomas Mandl (1926–2007), Czechoslovak-German-Jewish author, concert violinist, philosopher and inventor
 Johann Kaspar Mertz (1806–1856), Austrian composer
 Roman Mikulec (born 1972), Slovak politician and former soldier, Interior Minister of Slovakia from March 2020

N 
 Ondrej Nepela (1951–1989), Slovak figure skater

O 
 Adam Friedrich Oeser (1717–1799), German painter and sculptor
 Juraj Okoličány (1943–2008), Czechoslovak ice hockey referee and a Slovak ice hockey administrator
 Vladimir Oravsky (1947), Slovak-Swedish author and film director

P 
 Peter Podhradský (born 1979), Slovak ice hockey player
 Julius Podlipny (1898–1991), Slovak and Romanian painter
 Zuzana Pramuková (born 1981), Slovak footballer

R 
 Yossele Rosenblatt (1882–1933), Ukrainian-born chazzan and composer
 Milan Rufus (1928–2009), poet, essayist, children's writer and academic
 Adam Ružička (born 1999), ice hockey player
 Jakub Rybárik (born 1986), actor

S 
 Jozef Sabovčík (born 1963), Slovak figure skater
 Július Satinský (1941–2002), Slovak author and actor
 Franz Schmidt (1874–1939), Austrian composer
 Carl Franz Anton Ritter von Schreibers (1775–1852), Austrian naturalist
 Johann Andreas Segner (1704–1777), German physicist
 Radovan Sloboda (born 1982), Slovak professional ice hockey player
 Samuel Benjamin Sofer (1815–1871), Rabbi of Bratislava
 Shimon Sofer (1820–1883), Austrian Orthodox Jewish rabbi
 Majk Spirit (born 1984), Slovak rapper
 Anton Šťastný (born 1959), Slovak ice hockey player
 Peter Šťastný (born 1956), Slovak ice hockey player and politician
Pavol Steiner (1908–1969), Olympic water polo player, swimmer, and cardiac surgeon
 Ludwig Straus (1835–1899) Austrian violinist.
 Martin Suchý (born 1982), Slovak football player

T 
 Alfred Tauber (1866–1942), Austrian mathematician
Yvonne Tobis (born 1948), Israeli Olympic swimmer
 Vojtech Tuka (1880–1946), prime minister and minister of foreign affairs of the Slovak Republic (1939–1945), war criminal

U 
 Jenő Uhlyárik (1893–1974), Hungarian fencing-master

V 
 Alexander Vencel (born 1967), Slovak football player
 Ingrid Veninger (born 1968), actress, writer, director, producer, and film professor who later immigrated to Canada
 Jan Vilcek (born 1933), professor in the Department of Microbiology at the NYU School of Medicine
 Róbert Vittek (born 1982), Slovak football player

Z 
 Hanna Zemer (1925–2003), Israeli journalist
 Veronika Zuzulová (born 1984), Slovak alpine skier

References

 
People from Bratislava
Bratislava